Dave Considine (born March 29, 1952) is an American special education teacher and Democratic politician.  He is a member of the Wisconsin State Assembly, representing Baraboo and the 81st Assembly district since 2015.

Biography
Born in Janesville, Wisconsin, Considine grew up in North Prairie, Wisconsin, and graduated from Mukwonago High School. He received his bachelor's degree in education from University of Wisconsin–Whitewater and his masters in education from Viterbo University. He then taught school in the Baraboo School District for 29 years. On November 4, 2014, Considine was elected to the Wisconsin State Assembly and is a Democrat.

References

External links
Representative Dave Considine at Wisconsin Legislature
 
 

Living people
Politicians from Janesville, Wisconsin
University of Wisconsin–Whitewater alumni
Viterbo University alumni
Educators from Wisconsin
21st-century American politicians
1952 births
Democratic Party members of the Wisconsin State Assembly